Joseph A. Buttafuoco (born March 11, 1956) is an auto body shop owner from Long Island who had sex with a minor, Amy Fisher. Fisher  subsequently shot his wife, Mary Jo Buttafuoco, in the face. Tabloid news coverage labelled Fisher the "Long Island Lolita".

Buttafuoco later pleaded guilty to one count of statutory rape and served four months in jail.

Early life

Buttafuoco graduated from Massapequa High School.

Shooting incident
Amy Fisher and Buttafuoco began a sexual relationship around July 1991 after Fisher took her vehicle to Buttafuoco's auto body shop in Baldwin, Nassau County, New York. 

On May 19, 1992, Fisher confronted Buttafuoco's wife, Mary Jo, at the Buttafuocos' home. When Mary Jo answered the door, Fisher—posing as her own (fictitious) sister Ann Marie—offered, as proof of the affair, a T-shirt that Joey had given her with the logo of his auto body shop on it. The front porch confrontation escalated, and when Mary Jo demanded that Fisher leave and turned to go into the house to call Joey, Fisher shot her in the face with a .25 caliber semiautomatic pistol. Once Mary Jo regained consciousness, she identified Fisher as her assailant.

The investigation of the shooting and the subsequent court cases involving a series of conflicting claims received significant news coverage in both mainstream news outlets and tabloids.

Buttafuoco's lawyer maintained that Buttafuoco was never involved with Fisher and Fisher had invented the affair, while Fisher's lawyer portrayed Fisher as a victim whom Buttafuoco manipulated into committing the assault.

After Fisher's assault conviction, Buttafuoco was indicted on 19 counts of statutory rape, sodomy, and endangering the welfare of a child. He initially pleaded not guilty. He later changed his plea to guilty, admitting he had sex with Fisher when she was 16 and that he knew her age at the time. He was sentenced to six months' jail time and was released after serving four months and nine days of the sentence.

After his release from prison, Joey and Mary Jo Buttafuoco moved to California, where Mary Jo filed divorce papers in Ventura County Superior Court on February 3, 2003.

Unrelated charges
Buttafuoco has been convicted of crimes since the 1992 shooting incident:
 In 1995, he pleaded no contest to a solicitation-of-prostitution charge and was fined and placed on probation for two years.
 In 2004, he was sentenced to a year in jail and five years of probation after pleading guilty to auto insurance fraud. As part of the sentence, he is prohibited from working in the auto body industry in California for the rest of his life.
 In August 2005, he was charged with illegal possession of ammunition. As a convicted felon, he is legally not permitted to own ammunition. Probation officers found the ammunition during a search of his home. He pleaded no contest and began serving his sentence on January 8, 2007. He was released on April 28, 2007.

Media appearances
The significant coverage of the shooting incident made Buttafuoco a minor celebrity. During Fisher's trial, Buttafuoco appeared frequently on mainstream and tabloid news programs and talk shows and gave multiple interviews to all forms of media. David Letterman, in his last year of hosting Late Night with David Letterman, discussed the incident so often that Buttafuoco's name was a recurring punchline, while Saturday Night Live parodied the case in multiple sketches.

During an appearance on Saturday Night Live in January 1993, Madonna performed her single "Bad Girl" from her fifth studio album, Erotica (1992). At the end of the performance, she ripped up an 8–by–10 photograph of Buttafuoco, while yelling to her audience "Fight the real enemy!". This action was a spoof of the actions taken by Sinéad O'Connor when she acted on the program in October 1992, in which she ripped apart a photograph of Pope John Paul II and yelled the phrase as a protest against sexual abuse in the Roman Catholic Church. On Season 4 Episode 18 of Friends, Buttafuoco is referenced as hurting the cause of people named Joey. He was also referenced in an episode of 
NewsRadio, where one of the characters is sanctioned for doing a story on Buttafuoco; not out of the story's veracity, but that he accidentally mispronounced the surname to refer to a swear word.

In 2002, Buttafuoco participated in Celebrity Boxing, originally slated to oppose John Wayne Bobbitt, who dropped out after being arrested for domestic abuse. Bobbitt was replaced by female pro wrestler Joanie "Chyna" Laurer. Buttafuoco, despite being booed, won the fight in a majority decision (29–28, 29–27, 28–28).

In 2006, he and Fisher were reunited at the Lingerie Bowl for the coin toss.

On May 23, 2007, Mary Jo Buttafuocco appeared on Larry King Live to discuss the recent reunion of her ex-husband and the former "Long Island Lolita." At the time, Buttafuoco's second wife, Evanka, had recently filed for divorce, but withdrew her divorce petition on June 22, 2007.

On March 5, 2009, Joey Buttafuoco appeared in an episode of Judge Pirro, successfully suing an adult film actress for failure to pay an auto body bill. In 1997, Buttafuoco also appeared on Judge Judy with Ruth Webb.

Sixteen years after the incident, Mary Jo Buttafuoco wrote a book telling her story, Getting It Through My Thick Skull: Why I Stayed, What I Learned, and What Millions of People Involved with Sociopaths Need to Know. She was inspired to write the book after her son referred to her ex-husband as a sociopath. Not knowing what the word meant, she looked it up and had a realization which led to her going public with her story. The book was published in July 2009.

References

External links
 

1956 births
Living people
20th-century American criminals
21st-century American criminals
American male criminals
American people convicted of fraud
Criminals from California
Criminals from New York (state)
People convicted of statutory rape offenses
People from Massapequa, New York
Massapequa High School alumni